Lysinibacillus tabacifolii is a Gram-positive, strictly aerobic and endospore-forming  bacterium from the genus of Lysinibacillus which has been isolated from leaves of the plant Nicotiana tabacum.

References

Bacillaceae
Bacteria described in 2014